Elections to the Puducherry Legislative Assembly were held in February 1990, to elect members of the 30 constituencies in Puducherry (then known as Pondicherry), in India. The Indian National Congress won the popular vote, and the most seats, but M. D. R. Ramachandran of the Dravida Munnetra Kazhagam, was appointed as the Chief Minister of Puducherry. His party had an alliance with the CPI, and the Janata Dal.

Results

Elected members

See also
List of constituencies of the Puducherry Legislative Assembly
1990 elections in India

References

External links
  

1990 State Assembly elections in India
State Assembly elections in Puducherry
1990s in Pondicherry